Drenovec pri Leskovcu is a small settlement west of Leskovec pri Krškem in the Municipality of Krško in eastern Slovenia. The area is part of the traditional region of Lower Carniola. It is now included with the rest of the municipality in the Lower Sava Statistical Region.

Name
The name of the settlement was changed from Drenovec to Drenovec pri Leskovcu in 1953.

Cultural heritage
A Roman burial ground has been excavated near the settlement.

References

External links
Drenovec pri Leskovcu on Geopedia

Populated places in the Municipality of Krško